The Great American Novel (sometimes abbreviated as GAN) is a canonical novel that generally embodies and examines the essence and character of America. The term was coined by John William De Forest in an 1868 essay and later shortened to GAN. De Forest noted that the Great American Novel had most likely not been written yet. 

Practically, the term refers to a small number of books that have historically been the nexus of discussion, including Moby-Dick (1851), Adventures of Huckleberry Finn (1884), and The Great Gatsby (1925). Exactly what novel or novels warrant the title is without consensus and an assortment have been contended as the idea has evolved and continued into the modern age, with fluctuations in popular and critical regard. William Carlos Williams, Clyde Brion Davis and Philip Roth have written novels about the Great American Novel—titled as such—the latter in the 1970s, a time of prosperity for the concept.

Equivalents to and interpretations of the Great American Novel have arisen. Writers and academics have commented upon the term's pragmatics, the different types of novels befitting of title and the idea's relation to race and gender.

History

Background and etymology 

The development of American literature coincided with the nation's development, especially of its identity. Calls for an "autonomous national literature" first appeared during the American Revolution, and, by the mid-18th century, the possibility of American literature exceeding its European counterparts began to take shape, as did that of the Great American Novel, this time being the genesis of novels that would later be considered the Great American Novel.

The term "Great American Novel" originated in an 1868 essay by American Civil War novelist John William De Forest.  De Forest saw it serving as a "tableau" of American society, and said that the novel would "paint the American soul" and capture "the ordinary emotions and manners of American existence". Similarly, Daniel Pierce Thompson said it had to be distinctly American. Although De Forest espoused praise and critique for contemporaneous novels, he ultimately concluded that the Great American Novel had yet to be written. The essay's publication coincided with the rising prestige of the novel. Previously, only five percent of American books were marked as novels, with most fictional works given the self-effacing title of a "tale". In 1880, writer Henry James simplified the term with the initialism "GAN".

Development 
The term soon became popular, its ubiquity considered a cliché and disparaged by literary critics. Lawerence Buell stated that the concept was seen as a part of a larger national, cultural and political consolidation. According to JSTOR Daily's Grant Shreve, as the concept grew, concrete criteria for the Great American Novel developed:
 "It must encompass the entire nation and not be too consumed with a particular region.
 It must be democratic in spirit and form.
 Its author must have been born in the United States or have adopted the country as his or her own.
 Its true cultural worth must not be recognized upon its publication".

From the turn of the century to the mid-twentieth century, the idea eluded serious academic consideration, being dismissed as a "naively amateurish age-of-realism pipe dream" unaccustom to the culture of that time. Writers such as William Dean Howells and Mark Twain were equally blasé. Frank Norris too saw the concept as not befitting the time, stating that the fact of a great work being American should be incidental. Edith Wharton complained that the Great American Novel concept held a narrow view of the nation, simply being concerned with "Main Street". At this time, it also grew to become associated with masculine values.

Despite this critical disregard, many writers, prepped with "templates” and “recipes” for the matter, sought to create the next Great American Novel; Upton Sinclair and Sinclair Lewis both sought to create the Great American Novel with The Jungle (1906) and Babbit (1924), respectively. William Carlos Williams and Clyde Brion Davis released satirical explorations both entitled The Great American Novel – Philip Roth would later release a novel of the same name. Bernard F. Jr. Rogers said that Kurt Vonnegut's "entire career might be characterised as an attempt to produce something like "the GAN", but of its own time". The 1970s saw a general resurgence of the concept, with The New York Times using the phrase the most in their history, a total of 71 times. The revival was perhaps the result of social change and related anxieties and the pursuit of a plateau between them.

In the 21st century, retaining its contention and derision, the concept has move towards a more populist attitude, functioning as "catnip for a listicle-obsessed internet".  Adam Kirsch noted that books such as Roth's American Pastoral (1997) indicate that writers are still interested in creating the Great American Novel. Commenting upon the Great American Novel's place in the 21st century, Stephens Shapiro said that "Maybe the GAN is a theme that rises in interest when the existing world system is amidst transformation, as America's greatness of all kinds swiftly fades away." When asked in a 2004 interview if the Great American Novel could be written, Norman Mailer—who had long been interested in the idea—said it could not, for America had become too developed of a nation. Tony Tulathimutte similarly dismissed it as "a comforting romantic myth, which wrongly assumes that commonality is more significant than individuality".

Analysis

Racial and gender commentary 

Multiple commentators have noted the concept's relation to racial and national identity, be it influence from by large-scale immigration, which brought forth authors closely aligned with the Great American Novel or novels detailing marginalized peoples, some furthermore trying to "bridge the racial divide". Commenting upon the idea's racial aspects and presence in popular conscious, Hugh Kenner wrote in a 1953 issue of Perspective that:

Perrin, Andrew Hoberek and Barbara Probst Solomon all noted that the 70s saw Jews pursue the GAN. Perrin said it was a boom decade for, what Hoberek, called the "Jewish GAN". Solomon was by 1972 sick of "nice Jewish sons who are writing the GAN". Aaron Latham, in a 1971 article, highlighted Roth and Mailer as Jews who wanted to the write the next GJN and GAN, respectively.

The Great American Novel's relation to masculinity was seen as a problem by female writers. Gertrude Stein once lamented that, as a lesbian Jewish woman, she would be unable to compose the Great American Novel. Joyce Carol Oates similarly felt that "a woman could write it, but then it wouldn't be the GAN". Viet Thanh Nguyen said that  of the unspoken silences of the Great American Novel is the assumption that it can only be written by white men". Laura Miller wrote, in a Salon article, that "The presumption and the belligerence embodied in this ideal have put off many American women writers". She also noted that many characters in Great American Novel candidates are male: "the notion that a female figure might serve the same purpose undermines the very concept of the Great American Novel".  Although British analyst Faye Hammill noted that Gentlemen Prefer Blondes  by Anita Loos, was one of the few that 'doesn't stink'. Emily Temple of Literary Hub suggested that if the protagonist of Sylvia Plath's The Bell Jar (1963) were male it would likely be considered more seriously as a Great American Novel contender.

Interpretations 
There are several different interpretations of what makes a Great American Novel. Some say that it depicts a diverse group facing issues representative of "epoch-defining public events or crises." John Scalzi felt that for a novel to be the Great American Novel it had to be ubiquitous, notable and analyze America through a moral context. De Forest, similarly saw the Great American Novel as having to capture the "essence" of America, its quality irrelevant. Norris considered the musings upon what made a novel "great" and/or "American" to showcase patriotic insecurity. Mohsin Hamid echoed the idea that the GAN is indicative of insecurity, connecting it to a "colonial legacy".

Commentators have said that the concept is exclusively American in nature. Journalist John Walsh offered a national equal in the form of Russian writer Leo Tolstoy's War and Peace (1869); Buell felt that Australia was the only country to replicate America's search. Scholes said that the Great American Novel has always been thought of adjacent to European literature. David Vann was of the belief that they had to be "anti-American". Rogers felt that it does not need to have American protagonists or be set in America and should not espouse patriotism or nationalism.

Buell identifies multiple types of Great American Novels. First is one who is subject to mysticism and stands the test of time. The second is "the romance of the divide", which imagines national rifts in the "form of a family history and/or heterosexual love affair"—race often plays a role. The third variety encapsulates the American Dream and see its protagonist rise from obscurity. Fourthly, novels which are composed of a diverse cast of characters "imagined as social microcosms or vanguards" and who are placed with events and crises that serve to "constitute an image of 'democratic' promise or dysfunction". Buell also said speculative science fiction may be the basis for a possible fifth archetype.

Kasia Boddy wrote that,  its initial formulation", the concept "has always been more about inspiration than achievement; the very fact that it has been attempted but remains 'unwritten' providing a spur to future engagement with both nation and national literature". Speculating on De Forest's intentions when devising the notion of the Great American Novel and commenting upon its development, Cheryl Strayed wrote that:

Denoting an apocryphal state, A. O. Scott compared the GAN to the Yeti, the Loch Ness monster and the Sasquatch.

Equivalents in other media

Equivalents to the Great American Novel in other media have been proposed. For example:
"The Great American Painting"
 American Gothic (1930) – Grant Wood
 Cow's Skull: Red, White, and Blue (1930) – Georgia O'Keeffe
 Nighthawks (1942) – Edward Hopper
"The Great American TV Show"
 The Sopranos (1999–2007) – David Chase
"The Great American Movie"
 Gone with the Wind (1939) – Victor Fleming
 The Wizard of Oz (1939) –  Victor Fleming
"The Great American Poem"
 The Gettysburg Address (1863) – Abraham Lincoln

DeForest claimed that "the Great American Poem" could only be created after the United States had experienced hundreds of years of democracy; however, he believed that the Great American Novel could be written much sooner. Mark Binelli of the New York Times called documentary filmmaker Frederick Wiseman the "Great American Novelist" and said that his 50-year filmography was a manifestation of the Great American Novel. Jess Zafariss suggested that the Marvel comics by Jack Kirby and Stan Lee deserve the title.

Notable candidates

Notes and references

Notes

Citations

Works cited

Further reading

External links

 De Forest's essay on the Great American Novel

American culture
American literature
American novels